Balas is a village in Iran.

Balas may also refer to:

People 
 Alexander Balas, ruler of the Greek Seleucid kingdom
 Bill Balas, American screenwriter, director, and producer
 E. Andrew Balas (born 1951), doctor
 Edith Balas (born 1929), professor
 Egon Balas (1922–2019), applied mathematician and a professor
 Eli Balas, poker
 Eva Marija Balas, birth name of Eva Ras
 Iolanda Balaș (1936–2016), Romanian athlete
 Iván Balás (1894–1971), Yugoslav tennis player
 Mike Balas (1910–1996), pitcher
 Mohammad Balas (born 1982), footballer

See also 
 Balas ruby, a rose-tinted variety of spinel